Panimávida (in Mapudungun: "hill of pumas") is a town in the Chilean commune of Colbún, Linares Province, Maule Region. Panimávida is well known in Chile for being one of the oldest hot springs and resort spas in the country. Its population as of 2002 was 1,473 (737 male, 736 female).

From 1913 to 1954 Panimávida was a station on the narrow gauge Putagán—Colbún railway line between Linares and Colbún.

References

Hot springs of Chile
Populated places in Linares Province